The Tószeri originates at Cserhát, east of Nádújfalu in  Nógrád County, Hungary, at  above sea level. It flows to the west and reaches the river Iványi at Mátraterenye.

Settlements on the banks
 Nádújfalu
 Mátraterenye

Rivers of Hungary